Johnson College is a private technical school in Scranton, Pennsylvania. Johnson College was founded in 1912 as a trade school by Orlando S. Johnson, a wealthy coal baron, and offers associate degrees and certificates

External links
 Official website

Scranton, Pennsylvania
Educational institutions established in 1918
Universities and colleges in Lackawanna County, Pennsylvania
1918 establishments in Pennsylvania